XHUTT-FM is a Mexican college radio station owned by the Universidad Tecnológica de Tabasco in Villahermosa. The station broadcasts on 102.5 MHz and is known as Sintonía UTTAB.

History
XHUTT came on the air September 3, 2013, broadcasting with 812 watts. In March 2018, XHUTT increased its power to 2,860 watts.

References

Radio stations in Tabasco
University radio stations in Mexico
Villahermosa